Kundri Sankurha is a village in Jamui district, Bihar, India.

Villages in Jamui district